Greek letters are used in mathematics, science, engineering, and other areas where mathematical notation is used as symbols for constants, special functions, and also conventionally for variables representing certain quantities. In these contexts, the capital letters and the small letters represent distinct and unrelated entities. Those Greek letters which have the same form as Latin letters are rarely used: capital A, B, E, Z, H, I, K, M, N, O, P, T, Y, X. Small ι, ο and υ are also rarely used, since they closely resemble the Latin letters i, o and u. Sometimes, font variants of Greek letters are used as distinct symbols in mathematics, in particular for ε/ϵ and π/ϖ. The archaic letter digamma (Ϝ/ϝ/ϛ) is sometimes used.

The Bayer designation naming scheme for stars typically uses the first Greek letter, α, for the brightest star in each constellation, and runs through the alphabet before switching to Latin letters.

In mathematical finance, the Greeks are the variables denoted by Greek letters used to describe the risk of certain investments.

Typography
The Greek letter forms used in mathematics are often different from those used in Greek-language text: they are designed to be used in isolation, not connected to other letters, and some use variant forms which are not normally used in current Greek typography.

The OpenType font format has the feature tag "mgrk" ("Mathematical Greek") to identify a glyph as representing a Greek letter to be used in mathematical (as opposed to Greek language) contexts.

The table below shows a comparison of Greek letters rendered in TeX and HTML.
The font used in the TeX rendering is an italic style. This is in line with the convention that variables should be italicized. As Greek letters are more often than not used as variables in mathematical formulas, a Greek letter appearing similar to the TeX rendering is more likely to be encountered in works involving mathematics.

Concepts represented by a Greek letter

Αα (alpha)

  represents:
 the first angle in a triangle, opposite the side a
 the statistical significance of a result
 the false positive rate in statistics ("Type I" error)
 the fine-structure constant in physics
 the angle of attack of an aircraft
 an alpha particle (He2+)
 angular acceleration in physics
 the linear thermal expansion coefficient
 the thermal diffusivity
 In organic chemistry the α-carbon is the backbone carbon next to the carbonyl carbon, most often for amino acids
 right ascension in astronomy
 the brightest star in a constellation
 Iron ferrite and numerous phases within materials science
 the return in excess of the compensation for the risk borne in investment
 the α-conversion in lambda calculus
 the independence number of a graph
 a placeholder for ordinal numbers in mathematical logic
 a type of receptor for the neurotransmitter noradrenaline in neuroscience

Ββ (beta)

 Β represents the beta function
  represents:
 the thermodynamic beta, equal to (kBT)−1, where kB is Boltzmann's constant and T is the absolute temperature.
 the second angle in a triangle, opposite the side b
 the standardized regression coefficient for predictor or independent variables in linear regression (unstandardized regression coefficients are represented with the lower-case Latin b, but are often called "betas" as well)
 the ratio of collector current to base current in a bipolar junction transistor (BJT) in electronics (current gain)
 the false negative rate in statistics ("Type II" error)
 the beta coefficient, the non-diversifiable risk, of an asset in mathematical finance
 the sideslip angle of an airplane
 a beta particle (e− or e+)
 the beta brain wave in brain or cognitive sciences
 ecliptic latitude in astronomy
 the ratio of plasma pressure to magnetic pressure in plasma physics
 β-reduction in lambda calculus
 the ratio of the velocity of an object to the speed of light as used in the Lorentz factor
 a type of receptor for the noradrenaline neurotransmitter in neuroscience

Γγ (gamma)

 Γ represents:
 the circulation in fluid dynamics
 the reflection coefficient of a transmission or telecommunication line.
 the confinement factor of an optical mode in a waveguide
 the gamma function, a generalization of the factorial
 the upper incomplete gamma function
 the modular group, the group of fractional linear transformations
 the gamma distribution, a continuous probability distribution defined using the gamma function
 second-order sensitivity to price in mathematical finance
 the Christoffel symbols of the second kind
 the stack alphabet in the formal definition of a pushdown automaton , or the tape-alphabet in the formal definition of a Turing machine
 the Feferman–Schütte ordinal Γ0
  represents:
 the specific weight of substances
 the lower incomplete gamma function
 the third angle in a triangle, opposite the side c
 the Euler–Mascheroni constant in mathematics
 gamma rays and the photon
 the heat capacity ratio in thermodynamics
 the Lorentz factor in special relativity

Δδ (delta)

 Δ represents:
 a finite difference
 a difference operator
 a symmetric difference
 the Laplace operator
 giving heat in a chemical reaction
 the angle that subtends the arc of a circular curve in surveying
 the maximum degree of any vertex in a given graph
 sensitivity to price in mathematical finance
 the discriminant of a polynomial (in a quadratic polynomial determines the nature of the roots)
  represents:
 percent error 
 a variation in the calculus of variations
 the Kronecker delta function
 the Feigenbaum constants
 the force of interest in mathematical finance
 the Dirac delta function
 the receptor which enkephalins have the highest affinity for in pharmacology
 the Skorokhod integral in Malliavin calculus, a subfield of stochastic analysis
 the minimum degree of any vertex in a given graph
 a partial charge. δ− represents a negative partial charge, and δ+ represents a positive partial charge chemistry (See also: Solvation)
 the chemical shift of an atomic nucleus in NMR spectroscopy. For protons, this is relative to tetramethylsilane = 0.
 stable isotope compositions
 declination in astronomy
 noncentrality measure in statistics
 The transition function in the formal definition of a finite automaton, pushdown automaton, or Turing machine
 Not to be confused with ∂ which is based on the Latin letter d but often called a "script delta."

Εε (epsilon)

  represents:
 a small positive quantity; see limit
 a random error in regression analysis
 the absolute value of an error
 in set theory, the limit ordinal of the sequence 
 in computer science, the empty string
 the Levi-Civita symbol
 in electromagnetics, dielectric permittivity
 emissivity
 strain in continuum mechanics
 permittivity
 the Earth's axial tilt in astronomy
 elasticity in economics
 electromotive force
 in chemistry, the molar extinction coefficient of a chromophore
 in mathematics, a surreal number that is bigger than zero, but smaller than all the non-negative numbers.
 set membership symbol ∈ is based on ε

(digamma)

  is sometimes used to represent the digamma function, though the Latin letter F (which is nearly identical) is usually substituted.
 A hypothetical particle Ϝ speculated to be implicated in the 750 GeV diphoton excess, now known to be simply a statistical anomaly

Ζζ (zeta)

  represents:
 the Riemann zeta function and other zeta functions in mathematics
 the damping ratio

Ηη (eta)

 Η represents:
 the Eta function of Ludwig Boltzmann's H-theorem ("Eta" theorem), in statistical mechanics
 Information theoretic (Shannon) entropy
  represents:
 the intrinsic wave impedance of a medium (e.g. the impedance of free space)
 the partial regression coefficient in statistics, also interpreted as an effect size measure for analyses of variance 
 the eta meson
 viscosity
 energy conversion efficiency
 efficiency (physics)
 the Minkowski metric tensor in relativity
 η-conversion in lambda calculus
 the learning rate in machine learning and statistics

Θθ (theta)

 Θ (uppercase) represents:
 an asymptotically tight bound related to big O notation.
 sensitivity to the passage of time in mathematical finance
 in set theory, a certain ordinal number
  (lowercase) represents:
 a plane angle in geometry
 the angle to the x axis in the xy-plane in spherical or cylindrical coordinates (mathematics)
 the angle to the z axis in spherical coordinates (physics)
 the potential temperature in thermodynamics
 theta functions
 the angle of a scattered photon during a Compton scattering interaction
 the angular displacement of a particle rotating about an axis
 the Watterson estimator in population genetics
  ("script theta"), the cursive form of theta, often used in handwriting, represents
 the first Chebyshev function in number theory

Ιι (iota)

  represents:
 an inclusion map in set theory
 the index generator function in APL (in the form ⍳)
 the imaginary number equal to square root of −1
 the interior product

Κκ (kappa)

 Κ represents:
 the Kappa number, indicating lignin content in pulp
  represents:
 the Von Kármán constant, describing the velocity profile of turbulent flow 
 the kappa curve, a two-dimensional algebraic curve
 the condition number of a matrix in numerical analysis
 the connectivity of a graph in graph theory
 curvature
 dielectric constant 
 thermal conductivity (usually a lowercase Latin )
 electrical conductivity of a solution
 thermal diffusivity
 a spring constant (usually a lowercase Latin )
 the heat capacity ratio in thermodynamics (usually )
 the receptor which dynorphins have the highest affinity for in pharmacology

Λλ (lambda)

 Λ represents:
 the Lebesgue constant (interpolation), a bound for the interpolation error
 the von Mangoldt function in number theory
 the set of logical axioms in the axiomatic method of logical deduction in first-order logic
 the cosmological constant
 the lambda baryon
 a diagonal matrix of eigenvalues in linear algebra
 a lattice
 molar conductivity in electrochemistry
  represents:
 one wavelength of electromagnetic radiation
 the decay constant in radioactivity
 function expressions in the lambda calculus
 a general eigenvalue in linear algebra
 the expected number of occurrences in a Poisson distribution in probability
 the arrival rate in queueing theory
 the failure rate in reliability engineering
 the Lagrange multiplier in mathematical optimization, known as the shadow price in economics
 the Lebesgue measure denotes the volume or measure of a Lebesgue measurable set
 longitude in geodesy
 linear density
 ecliptic longitude in astronomy
 the Liouville function in number theory
 the Carmichael function in number theory
 the empty string in formal grammar
 a formal system in mathematical logic
 thermal conductivity
 the Lorentz transformation

Μμ (mu)

  represents:
 the Möbius function in number theory
 the population mean or expected value in probability and statistics
 a measure in measure theory
 micro-, an SI prefix denoting 10−6 (one millionth)
 the coefficient of friction in physics
 the service rate in queueing theory
 the dynamic viscosity in physics
 magnetic permeability in electromagnetics
 a muon
 reduced mass
 the ion mobility in plasma physics
 the Standard gravitational parameter in celestial mechanics
 a micron or micrometer (10−6 meter) (common usage in biology, though officially revoked in 1967)
 population mean in statistics
 chemical potential in thermodynamics
 Absolute refractive index of a medium in optics

Νν (nu)

  represents:
 frequency in physics in hertz (Hz)
 Poisson's ratio in material science
 a neutrino
 kinematic viscosity of liquids
 stoichiometric coefficient in chemistry
 true anomaly in celestial mechanics
 degrees of freedom in statistics
 the matching number of a graph
 the p-adic valuation of a number

Ξξ (xi)

 Ξ represents:
 the original Riemann Xi function, i.e. Riemann's lower case ξ, as denoted by Edmund Landau and currently
 the xi baryon
  represents:
 the original Riemann Xi function
 the modified definition of Riemann xi function, as denoted by Edmund Landau and currently
 correlation length in physics

Οο (omicron)

Ππ (pi)

 Π represents:
 the product operator in mathematics
 a plane
 the unary projection operation in relational algebra
 osmotic pressure
  represents:
 Archimedes' constant (more commonly just called Pi), the ratio of a circle's circumference to its diameter
 the prime-counting function
 the state distribution of a Markov chain
 in reinforcement learning, a policy function defining how a software agent behaves for each possible state of its environment
 a type of covalent bond in chemistry (pi bond)
 a pion (pi meson) in particle physics
 in statistics, the population proportion
 nucleotide diversity in molecular genetics
 in electronics, a special type of small signal model is referred to as a hybrid-pi model
 in relational algebra for databases, represents projection
 ϖ (a graphic variant, see pomega) represents:
 angular frequency of a wave, in fluid dynamics (angular frequency is usually represented by  but this may be confused with vorticity in a fluid dynamics context)
 longitude of pericenter, in astronomy
 comoving distance, in cosmology

Ρρ (rho)

 Ρ represents:
 one of the Gegenbauer functions in analytic number theory (may be replaced by the capital form of the Latin letter P).
  represents:
 one of the Gegenbauer functions in analytic number theory.
 the Dickman-de Bruijn function
 the radius in a polar, cylindrical, or spherical coordinate system
 the correlation coefficient in statistics
 the radius of convergence in real analysis
 the sensitivity to interest rate in mathematical finance
 density (mass or charge per unit volume; may be replaced by the capital form of the Latin letter D)
 resistivity
 the shape and reshape operators in APL (in the form ⍴)
 the rename operator in relational algebra
 the plastic number

Σσς (sigma)

 Σ represents:
 the summation operator
 the covariance matrix
 the set of terminal symbols in a formal grammar
  represents:
 Stefan–Boltzmann constant in blackbody radiation
 the divisor function in number theory
 the real part of the complex variable  in analytic number theory
 the sign of a permutation in the theory of finite groups
 the population standard deviation, a measure of spread in probability and statistics
 a type of covalent bond in chemistry (sigma bond)
 the selection operator in relational algebra
 stress in mechanics
 electrical conductivity
 area density
 nuclear cross section
 surface charge density for microparticles
 standard deviation of a random variable in statistics

Ττ (tau)

  represents:
 torque, the net rotational force in mechanics
 the elementary tau lepton in particle physics
 a mean lifetime, of an exponential decay or spontaneous emission process
 the time constant of any device, such as an RC circuit
 proper time in relativity
 one turn: the constant ratio of a circle's circumference to its radius, with value  (6.283...).
 Kendall tau rank correlation coefficient, a measure of rank correlation in statistics
 Ramanujan's tau function in number theory
 shear stress in continuum mechanics
 a type variable in type theories, such as the simply typed lambda calculus
 path tortuosity in reservoir engineering
 in topology, a given topology
 the tau in biochemistry, a protein associated to microtubules
 the number of divisors of highly composite numbers 
 precision, the reciprocal of variance, in statistics

ϒυ (upsilon)

 ϒ (U+03D2) represents:
 the upsilon meson

Φφ (phi)

 Φ represents:
 the work function in physics; the energy required by a photon to remove an electron from the surface of a metal
 magnetic flux or electric flux
 the cumulative distribution function of the normal distribution in statistics
 phenyl functional group in organic chemistry (pseudoelement symbol)
 the value of the integration of information in a system (based on integrated information theory)
 Geopotential

Note: A symbol for the empty set, resembles Φ but is not Φ.
  or  represents:
 the golden ratio 1.618... in mathematics, art, and architecture
 Euler's totient function in number theory
 the argument of a complex number in mathematics
 the value of a plane angle in physics and mathematics
 the angle to the z axis in spherical coordinates (mathematics)
 epoch or phase difference between two waves or vectors
 the angle to the x axis in the xy-plane in spherical or cylindrical coordinates (physics)
 latitude in geodesy
 radiant flux
 neutron flux
 electric potential
 a scalar field in quantum field theory
 the probability density function of the normal distribution in statistics
 the Veblen functions

Χχ (chi)

  represents:
the chi distribution in statistics ( is the more frequently encountered chi-squared distribution)
 the chromatic number of a graph in graph theory
 the Euler characteristic in algebraic topology
 electronegativity in the periodic table
 the Fourier transform of a linear response function
 a character in mathematics; especially a Dirichlet character in number theory
 sometimes the mole fraction
 a characteristic or indicator function in mathematics
 the magnetic susceptibility of a material in physics
 the fission neutron energy spectrum in neutron transport

Ψψ (psi)

 Ψ represents:
 water potential
 a quaternary combinator in combinatory logic
 a symbol for psychology
  represents:
 the wave function in the Schrödinger equation of quantum mechanics
 the psi-Mesons in particle physics
 the stream function in fluid dynamics
 the reciprocal Fibonacci constant
 the second Chebyshev function in number theory
 the polygamma function in mathematics
 the supergolden ratio

Ωω (omega)

 Ω represents:
 Absolute Infinity
 the SI unit measure of electrical resistance, the ohm
 the right ascension of the ascending node (RAAN) or Longitude of the ascending node in astronomy and orbital mechanics
 the omega constant 0.5671432904097838729999686622...
 an asymptotic lower bound notation related to big O notation
 in probability theory and statistical mechanics, the support
 a solid angle
 the omega baryon
 the arithmetic function counting a number's prime factors counted with multiplicity
 the density parameter in cosmology
 the first uncountable ordinal (also written as ω1)
  represents:
 angular velocity / radian frequency (rad/sec)
 the argument of periapsis in astronomy and orbital mechanics
 a complex cube root of unity — the other is  — (used to describe various ways of calculating the discrete Fourier transform)
 the differentiability class (i.e. ) for functions that are infinitely differentiable because they are complex analytic
 the first infinite ordinal
 the omega meson
 the set of natural numbers in set theory (although  or N is more common in other areas of mathematics)
 an asymptotic dominant notation related to big O notation
 in probability theory, a possible outcome of an experiment
 the arithmetic function counting a number's distinct prime factors
 the symbol ϖ, a graphic variant of π, is sometimes construed as omega with a bar over it; see π
 the unsaturated fats nomenclature in biochemistry (e.g. ω−3 fatty acids)
 the first uncountable ordinal  (also written as Ω)
 the clique number (number of vertices in a maximum clique) of a graph in graph theory

See also
 Blackboard bold letters used in mathematics
 English pronunciation of Greek letters
 List of mathematical uses of Latin letters
 List of letters used in mathematics and science
 Glossary of mathematical symbols
 Mathematical Alphanumeric Symbols (a Unicode block)
 Mathematical notation

References

External links
 A pronunciation guide with audio
 Greek alphabet letters onclick copy paste